Hossam Hassan Abdel Badie Mohamed el-Hamzawy (born 2 September 1993) is an Egyptian professional footballer who plays as a forward for Egyptian League club Smouha (on loan from Al Ahly).

Club career
In the 2020–21 season Hassan went on loan to Libyan Premier League club Al-Ahli Tripoli SC, reaching the finals of the Libyan Premier league only to miss out on the League title by missing a kick in the penalty shootouts.

International career
He made his debut for the Egypt national football team on 14 October 2019 in a friendly against Botswana.

References

External links
 

1993 births
Living people
People from Benha
Egyptian footballers
Egypt international footballers
Association football forwards
Tala'ea El Gaish SC players
El Dakhleya SC players
Egyptian Premier League players